Frances Lillian Willard "Fannie" Munds (June 10, 1866 – December 16, 1948) was an American suffragist and leader of the suffrage movement within Arizona.  After achieving her goal of statewide women's suffrage, she went on to become a member of the Arizona Senate more than five years before ratification of the 19th Amendment to the United States Constitution granted the vote to all American women. She lived in Prescott, Arizona and represented Yavapai County in 1915. She was a Democrat.

Early life
Munds was born Frances Lillian Willard in Franklin, California, on June 10, 1866, the eighth child of Joel and Mary Grace Vinyard Willard and a granddaughter of Alexander Hamilton Willard (1777–1865)  who had been a member of the Lewis and Clark Expedition.  Her family were ranchers who moved to Nevada before moving on to the Arizona Territory.  Willard was educated at the Central Institute in Pittsfield, Maine, graduating in 1885.

After graduation, Willard joined her family in the Arizona Territory, where her four brothers operated a ranch in the Verde Valley with her father's former business partner, William Munds (Joel Willard had died in 1879).  She worked as a school teacher in the communities of Pine, Payson, and Mayer before marrying John Lee Munds, youngest son of Willard Munds, in 1890.  The couple moved to Prescott in 1893 where John Munds was elected Yavapai County sheriff for two terms beginning in 1899.  The couple had one son and two daughters.

Suffrage efforts
In 1898, Munds was elected secretary for the Territory of Arizona Women Suffrage Organization.  Together with organization president Pauline O'Neill (1865–1961), she reached out to Mormon women within the territory.  This marked a change from the practices of earlier suffrage leaders, such as Josephine Brawley Hughes, who had shunned the Mormon community.  This outreach enabled the organization to lobby Mormon members of the territorial legislature to support legislation supporting women. 
Munds also attended legislative sessions personally to lobby for women's issues.  After several years' effort, the 1903 territorial legislature passed a bill granting women the vote.  This legislation was later vetoed by Territorial Governor Alexander Brodie.  A similar bill would later be vetoed by Governor Kibbey.

In 1909, with statehood appearing imminent, Munds struck a deal with the Western Federation of Miners in which the labor union would support women's suffrage in exchange for the women's organization's support in labor issues.
The next year, during Arizona's constitutional convention, a proposal granting women's suffrage was introduced.  The proposed plank was defeated before it could be added to the constitution.

Following Arizona's admission to the Union on February 14, 1912, a meeting of the State of Arizona Women Suffrage Organization unanimously elected Munds the organization's president.  She initially refused to accept the position, but acquiesced on the condition the position be renamed chairman, and that she be allowed to reorganize the state organization.  During the summer of 1912, Munds helped organize a petition drive to collect the 3,342 signatures needed for a ballot initiative.  After gathering the needed signatures, Munds then proceeded to get the support of 95% of the state's labor unions.  When the Progressive party came out in favor of the suffrage issue, Munds was able to force the Democratic and Republican parties to reevaluate their positions by threatening to throw support from women to the third party.  When the election results were counted, the suffrage initiative had passed by a three-to-one margin in every county.

Political career
In 1913, Governor George Hunt appointed Munds to represent Arizona at the International Woman Suffrage Alliance in Budapest, Hungary.  The next year, she, along with Rachel Berry (1859–1948) of Apache County, became the first women elected to the Arizona Legislature (representing Yavapai County).

Upon her entry to the state legislature in 1915, Munds said, "true blue conservatives will be shocked to think of a grandmother sitting in the State Senate."  During her time in office, she chaired the Committee on Education and Public Institutions, and also served on the Land Committee.  Sen. Munds also introduced legislation doubling the widow's tax exemption.  She chose not to run for a second term in the legislature, but in 1918 was persuaded to run for Secretary of State, a run which was unsuccessful.

After leaving office, Munds remained active in politics for the rest of her life.  She died at home on December 16, 1948, and was buried at the Mountain View cemetery in Prescott, Arizona.

In 1982, she was inducted into the Arizona Women's Hall of Fame.

See also

Willard House (Cottonwood, Arizona)

References

Other sources
Heidi Osselaer  (2009) Winning Their Place: Arizona Women in Politics, 1883-1950  (University of Arizona Press)

External links
O'Neill/Munds House The Historical Marker Database

                   

American suffragists
Democratic Party Arizona state senators
Women state legislators in Arizona
Politicians from Prescott, Arizona
People from Sacramento County, California
1866 births
1948 deaths
Activists from Arizona
Activists from California